State Route 522 (SR 522) is an east–west state highway in the southern portion of the U.S. state of Ohio.

Route description
State Route 522's path takes it through portions of Scioto and Lawrence Counties.  No segment of this highway is included within the National Highway System, a network of highways deemed most important for the economy, mobility and defense of the country.

History
State Route 522 was designated in 1947.  The original routing of the state route followed the majority of today's routing, running from its junction with what was then a two-lane alignment of U.S. Route 52 (now known as Gallia Street) on the southern fringe of Wheelersburg to its present eastern terminus at what was then known as State Route 75 (now State Route 93). In 1971, with the completion of a new four-lane expressway through the Wheelersburg vicinity, U.S. Route 52 was routed onto this expressway.  State Route 522, in turn, was extended southerly along the former two-lane alignment of U.S. Route 52 to its present-day western terminus where this roadway meets the U.S. Route 52 expressway at a diamond interchange.

Major intersections

References

External links

522
Transportation in Scioto County, Ohio
Transportation in Lawrence County, Ohio